Phenicarbazide is a semicarbazide and an antipyretic substance. It is carcinogenic in mice.

Preparation 
Phenicarbazide can be obtained by mixing phenylhydrazine with acetic acid in aqueous solution with the addition of potassium cyanide. It is also obtained from the reaction of phenylhydrazine with urea.

Properties 
Phenicarbazide is a flammable, hard to ignite, crystalline, beige solid that is practically insoluble in water. It decomposes on heating.

Uses 
Phenicarbazide is an intermediate in the syntheses of a series of chemical compounds by cyclocondensation reactions.  It was investigated as an analgesic and antipyretic in the 1970s and was used in combination preparations.

References 

Semicarbazides
Anilines